Linden Depot is a historic train station located at Linden, Montgomery County, Indiana. In 1852 the New Albany and Salem Railroad (later Monon) Railroad cut through Montgomery County, Indiana. The old stage road between Crawfordsville and Linden was given to the railroad as an inducement to get them to build through Linden. 1852 also saw the building of the first Linden depot, on a site behind the present day Post Office. The building was moved to the current location in 1881 when the Toledo, St. Louis and Western Railroad was built through Linden, crossing the Monon at this location.

It was listed on the National Register of Historic Places in 1990.

Museum
Located in the disused Monon Railroad Station, the Linden Museum is run by the Linden-Madison Twp. Historical Society. The museum is a joint venture between the Linden-Madison Twp. Historical Society and the Monon Railroad Historical/Technical Society.

References

External links
Linden Depot Museum

Railway stations on the National Register of Historic Places in Indiana
Railroad museums in Indiana
Museums in Montgomery County, Indiana
Former Monon Railroad stations
National Register of Historic Places in Montgomery County, Indiana
Transportation buildings and structures in Montgomery County, Indiana
Railway stations in the United States opened in 1905